Sagalo  is a remote village and rural commune in the Cercle of Kéniéba in the Kayes Region of south-western Mali. It lies near the border with Guinea. The commune includes 17 villages and at the time of the 2009 census had a population of 15,830.

References

External links
.

Communes of Kayes Region